Sibley Lake is a lake in the U.S. state of Minnesota.

Sibley Lake was named for Henry Hastings Sibley, 1st Governor of Minnesota.

See also
List of lakes in Minnesota

References

Lakes of Minnesota
Lakes of Cass County, Minnesota
Lakes of Crow Wing County, Minnesota